United Nations Security Council resolution 1411, adopted unanimously on 17 May 2002, after recalling resolutions 827 (1993), 955 (1994), 1165 (1998), 1166 (1998) and 1329 (2000), the Council amended the statutes of the International Criminal Tribunals for Rwanda (ICTR) and the former Yugoslavia (ICTY) to address the issue of judges holding dual nationalities.

The Security Council recognised that judges at the ICTR and ICTY may bear the nationalities of two or more countries and that one such person in this position had been elected to serve at one of the tribunals. It considered that such persons should bear the nationality of the state in which they normally exercise civil and political rights. Acting under Chapter VII of the United Nations Charter, the statutes for both tribunals were amended accordingly to include this provision.

See also
 Bosnian Genocide
 List of United Nations Security Council Resolutions 1401 to 1500 (2002–2003)
 Rwandan genocide
 Yugoslav Wars

References

External links
 
Text of the Resolution at undocs.org

 1411
2002 in Yugoslavia
2002 in Rwanda
 1411
 1411
May 2002 events